Armenian College and Philanthropic Academy (ACPA) is an Armenian school in Kolkata (formerly Calcutta), India. , it is the sole Armenian-centred school in the eastern section of the world, and has been so throughout its history. It is commonly known and called Armenian College.

The institution was founded by members of the Calcutta Armenian Community primarily to educate their own children. The Armenian College has played a distinguished and important role in the preservation and spread of Armenian culture throughout the world. The pupils of the Armenian College have distinguished themselves in business, commerce, science and the arts.

It serves students from Class I, until Class X.

Origins
Margar Hovhannisian is considered to be a pioneer in establishing schools for Calcutta's Armenian students, educating them from 1763 in his own home. As was the custom in those early days in Calcutta, many private individuals were opening private schools for the education of the children of the growing township and there were several schools run by Armenians at which Armenians and other children were educated. Reports of a school established by Harutyun Galutsian appeared in 1798, but by no means proves that there were no other schools running at the same time.  The Armenian Seminary of St. Sanducts at Sukias Lane, existed even prior to 1851, when a report of its examinations (in 1851) appeared in the local Calcutta Press, "The Friend of India".   Like many compatriots, Astvatsatur Muradghanian left Rs. 8000 in his will dated 30 July 1797, towards the establishment of a school for the education of Armenian Children. Some writers incorrectly state that he could have left money to establish an "Armenian College" when the name itself was not even decided at the time of his death. Later, another Julfa born merchant, Manatsakan Sambat Vardanian of Saidabad in 1816, published a pamphlet "Hravirak" through which he urged his compatriots to donate money for establishing a school for Armenian children. He managed to collect Rs. 59,583. In a petition to the Calcutta High Court in Suit No. 286 of 1879, the elders of the Armenian Community including Sir Gregory Charles Paul. the Advocate General of Bengal, informed the Court that prior to the year 1818 subscriptions and contributions were obtained from various Members of the Armenian community in Calcutta towards the foundation and support of a School in Calcutta for the education and maintenance, gratuitous and otherwise of children born of parents belonging to the Armenian community, and that with the money so obtained in or about the year 1818, a school or institution for the above-mentioned purposes was established in Calcutta. Thereafter at a General Meeting of the Armenian Community at Calcutta on 2 April 1821, the Rule and Regulations of the School were formally adopted and framed in a document entitled:
"ARMENIAN PHILANTROPHIC ACADEMY FOUNDED BY THE ARMENIAN COMMUNITY OF INDIA ON THE 2ND APRIL 1821". This document is the earliest set of rules, which embodies the intentions of the Founders of the Institution. A copy of the Regulations of 1821 was annexed to the High Court petition and was marked with the letter "A".

Ethnic Armenians Astvatsatur Muradghanian and Mnatsakan Vardanian established the school in 1821. Since that year it has occupied the same building. The School began functioning from the premises of an earlier school at no 358, Old China Bazar Street, the property of an Armenian, close to the Armenian Church, then called "Nazar's Holy Armenian Church". Four years later, Galutsian’s school joined ACPA and he himself became the Principal, serving till the end of his life (10 November 1833). Manatsakan Vardanian donated Rs. 10,000 to Nazar's Holy Armenian Church.

Move to Mirza Ghalib St
In 1884, ACPA, purchased the house and land at 56B, Free School St, later known as Mirza Ghalib Street, which had been the birthplace and residence of William Makepeace Thackeray,(1811–1863) an Anglo-Indian poet and novelist and the author of Vanity Fair and other classics. An inscription on a marble stone is the only surviving relic of the Thackeray residence which was demolished in the 1970s for the construction of the, then, New College building. Further renovations, changes and additions in and around the building included the Main School building, the Hall building, "Mary Apcar" building, the Office building, a new building along the street and the swimming pool.

The Main School building was a three-storeyed construction that included the senior dormitory, classrooms and the chemistry laboratory. The Hall building was a double-storeyed edifice built in 1890 by the efforts of Mesrovb Jacob Seth and Mr Movses. The first floor had a stage which served as a theatre during concerts and cultural programs as well as the dining hall of the school, designed for 200 people. In 1896, by agreement with the Managing Committee of the Armenian College, Arathoon Apcar, created the MARY APCAR TRUST and bought the plot of land at the School gate to serve as a dormitory for the Apcar Scholars of the Mary Apcar Trust. Arathoon Apcar by agreement with the Committee of the Armenian College, attended by the then Advocate General of Bengal, Sir Gregory Charles Paul, founded the Mary Apcar Trust to benefit offspring of the Apcar family or those children nominated by them. The Trust deed stated that the Committee of the St. Mary's Church Isfahan, would have rights of "nomination" of Scholars, and if no Armenians were to be found from Iran, then the benefits would be applicable to needy students of India. In the last 30 years, the dormitory has been closed, and the building leased out for commercial offices. There are no Apcar scholars staying in the Mary Apcar building.

Major expansion of the Armenian College took place when the Managers were real-estate merchants. In 1929 under the management of the most famous of all Calcutta Armenians, late J.C. Galstaun, another building was bought with the assistance of the Armenian Church and in 1930 was amalgamated to the school as the Office building. In 1930, a plot next to the school was bought and was transformed into a playground. At the same time, at the southern part of the playground a swimming pool was constructed with the help of benefactor Peter Crete. Crete was a fabulously rich Roman Catholic Armenian Merchant with huge interests in real estate and a pioneer in the coal mining industry in Raniganj, West Bengal, India. Besides his huge donations for the benefit of the Calcutta Armenian Community, Peter Crete bought the San Lazaro Islands, Venice, Italy, which became the foremost institute of Armenian culture anywhere in the world, and is the Monastery of the Mekhitarist monks of San Lazaro. The swimming pool donated by Peter Crete still exists and is used by both boys and girls of the College. In 1953 the ACPA and Davidian Girls’ School were recognised as forming one co-educational unit. In 1956 the school band played for the visit to India of the Shah of Iran. Since 1958, ACPA has held the status of a higher secondary educational institution.

ACPA recent history

In 1999, the High Court of West Bengal on a petition by an Armenian, Sonia John, Justice Sujit Sinha of the Calcutta High Court ordered that the Catholicos of the Armenian Apostolic Church would 'administer the school' in terms of the submissions made in the application to the Calcutta High Court. The submissions made to the High Court included a Committee of Management but has not been acted upon since the date of the order in 1999. In the same year, the first group arrived from Armenia. The college has educated students from India, Kuwait, Iran, Iraq, Syria, Turkey, Azerbaijan and Armenia. In 2006, ACPA celebrated its 185th Anniversary, the college receiving a number of distinguished guests on the occasion, including the Governor of West Bengal. A year later in February 2007 the college received the first Pontifical visit of Karekin II, the Supreme Patriarch and Catholicos of All Armenians who also made a second visit to Kolkata in 2008 to preside over the 300th Anniversary celebrations of the Armenian Holy Church of Nazareth.

Operations it has no tuition and provides free room and board due to the funds donated by Kolkata-born ethnic Armenian Sir Catchick Paul Chater.

Student body
the majority of the student body originates from the country of Armenia while that year it also had students from Burma (Myanmar), Iran, Iraq, and Russia.  Armenians were the majority with a significant number from Iran; two of the students in total were locals from Kolkata and one was from Iraq.

many students come to the school to improve their English abilities as the English-language environments of their home countries are not as robust as India's.

Armenian Sports Club (KOLKATA)

"ARUN" (Blood), Armenian Sports Club young players, made up of mostly boys from Armenian College is the youngest team in the entire Nation. The word "ARUN" which means blood in Armenian is their slogan which they shout at the beginning of each match.
Armenians in Kolkata play Rugby as if it was their birthright. Armenia does not have a Rugby team and the people do not know anything about the game at all, but the small Armenian community in Kolkata has one of the oldest and the best team which has won numerous tournaments over the years.
In Kolkata Armenians are known for their incredible passion and skill in Rugby. They play at national and international levels. They represent the India national rugby team in various Asian games. In 2008 the India national team was made up of 12 Armenian players and 3 Indian.

Davidian Girls’ School
Before 1842 ACPA had had a girls’ section with special teachers and separate classrooms. A "Second Galutsian School" was established by Hovhannes Avdalian established a girls private school in his own home and named in honour of his teacher, but this also closed down in due course. A third attempt was initiated on 16 February 1846, when M. D. Taghiadian opened a girls’ school and named it Saint Sandught, later adding a boys section. At its height there were 35 pupils (15 girls and 20 boys) but Saint Sandught closed down six years later.

The education of Indian-Armenian girls was seemingly ignored until 1922 when David Avetic Davidian founded the Trust of D.A. David (in his own name) and started a school for local girls and boys, inviting Mrs. Sandught Hovhannisian to teach in the new institution. Until his death, David remained the "Principal" of the School and managed it himself with the assistance of a Committee in terms of the trust he created. It was his intention to expand the school from his own house at Royd Street, to a much bigger place and Davidian purchased the huge grounds and buildings of the London Missionary Society at No 1, Ashutosh Mukherjee Road, Calcutta 700025 and gave it to the Trust in an agreement with the Official Trustee, Govt. of West Bengal, who is the Ex-Officio Trustee of the Trust of D.A. David. For some time during his last years the School moved out to its new premises in the Missionary Building but after his death in 1936, the children were brought back to Royd Street, and in the 1980s the premises of No 1, Ashutosh Mukherjee Road, was leased out to Elgin Properties at a huge loss to the Davidian Trust.

In 1949, while retaining its autonomy, the Davidian Girls’ School (DGS) joined ACPA and appealed to Indian Certificate of Secondary Education to recognize the entity of ACPA and DGS, as one co-educational school. This appeal was adopted in 1953, following which the collaboration between the two schools was reinforced.

Araratian Library
In 1828, on 7 April, the "Araratian Library" was opened. It was famous for its rich collection of old Armenian manuscripts and books. The library is called "Araratian" in the honour of Mount Ararat, the place where Noah’s Ark landed after the flood. Some of the books were donated by Armenian literary and cultural figures and some were bought with money donated to the institution. The library was administered by the rector and was used by the students as well as Armenians from outside. On 1 June 1924, the Armenian Publishing House was transferred to Armenian College and thus began the publishing work that lasted over 50 years. The first publication of the school was probably the 10 page long booklet, "The Meaning of Reverend, his Attire and the Ceremony of Holy Liturgy".  Sadly none of the rich collection of old and historical Armenian manuscripts and books exist today.  Historian and author Mesrovb Seth wrote in his 1937 book Armenians in India from the Earliest Time to the Present Day:

At the Armenian College in Calcutta, the Araratian Library, which had been founded on 7th April 1828 had grown significantly by 1843 when it contained over 1000 precious and rare Armenian manuscripts.

In January 1890, the late Professor Frederick Conybeare, a distinguished Armenist of international reputation, paid a visit to the Academy, accompanied by his accomplished wife, who was a daughter of the world-renowned orientalist, Max Muller.  He wished to see the college library, expecting to find some rare Armenian manuscripts, as he had found in Armenia, during a tour in 1888.  We happened to be present in the college at that time, and acted as a cicerone, not knowing who the strange visitor, with long hair, was. We showed him the remnants of the once-famous "Araratian Library" and placed in his hands an Armenian work, printed by Jacob Shameer at Madras, in 1772, thinking we were showing him a rare publication, but he said that he had seen it already in the Madras Armenian Church Library. He then desired to see the manuscripts and was visibly disappointed on learning that they had disappeared long ago.

The Araratian Library having ceased to exist with the mysterious disappearance of the numerous books and manuscripts in the Armenian, English, Latin, Greek, French, Dutch, Persian, Chinese and other languages in the church library. When we looked at the books, we found that most of them were worm-eaten but the older 17th and 18th century ones were in better shape than the newer ones because paper used to be made from cotton rags rather than wood pulp combined with softening chemicals. These same chemicals accelerate the deterioration of paper. Amongst the older books are three volumes comprising section of the New Testament in Armenian, dating back to the 17th century. The newer ones include an almost complete edition of the "Encyclopædia Britannica" the first volumes of which were published in 1871."  As far as can be ascertained, the books remain in Dhaka in their unpreserved state and quite probably not much left of them."

References

External links
 Armenian College Official school website

Boarding schools in West Bengal
Schools in Kolkata
Schools in Colonial India
Educational institutions established in 1821
1821 establishments in India
Armenian schools
19th century in Kolkata